Ushimagusa Dam is an earthfill dam located in Gunma Prefecture in Japan. The dam is used for irrigation. The catchment area of the dam is 6.2 km2. The dam impounds about 10  ha of land when full and can store 900 thousand cubic meters of water. The construction of the dam was started on 1951 and completed in 1955.

References

Dams in Gunma Prefecture